Brainsby is a surname. Notable people with the surname include:

Harold Brainsby (1910–1975), New Zealand field athlete
Tony Brainsby (1945–2000), British publicist

See also
Bransby

English-language surnames